The Edmund S. Muskie Internship Program is a professional exchange program supported by the United States Department of State. It provides summer internship placements, career training, and financial support to Eurasian scholars and graduate students studying in the United States.

Eligible fields of study for the Muskie Program are: business administration, economics, education, environmental management, international affairs, journalism and mass communication, law, library and information science, public administration, public health or public policy.

The program was established by the United States Congress beginning from 1992 fiscal year (Sec. 227) and was designated Edmund S. Muskie name by the Freedom Support Act of 1992 (Sec. 801).

The Muskie program with a renewed format and scope was launched by Cultural Vistas in 2015.

In the past, the program was administered by International Research & Exchanges Board and American Council of Teachers of Russian/American Council for Collaboration in Education and Language.

See also
 Edmund S. Muskie
 Edmund S. Muskie Graduate Fellowship Program

External links
 Official Edmund S. Muskie Internship Program website

Internship programs
Scholarships in the United States
Higher education in the United States
Bureau of Educational and Cultural Affairs